The 2009 BSN season was the 89th season of the Baloncesto Superior Nacional (BSN), the men's basketball league of Puerto Rico. It began in May 2009 and ended in August of the same year. This season saw the revival of an old rivalry, when in the finals the Vaqueros de Bayamon met with the Piratas de Quebradillas, with the Vaqueros winning.

Regular season standings

Playoff
The playoff format used was a round-robin tournament with two groups of four teams and the best two teams passing into the semifinals.

Teams

References

External links
 Official site 

Baloncesto Superior Nacional
2009 in Puerto Rican sports
2008–09 in American basketball